KC Corkery (born April 26, 1983) is a retired American male tennis player.

College career 
Corkery was a four-time All-American in singles and a four-time All-American in doubles.  

Corkery was the 2004 NCAA doubles champion with Sam Warburg and semi-finalist in the 2006 NCAA singles championship.  

In 2003, he was the Pac-10 Freshman of the Year, ITA West Region Rookie of the Year, and Stanford Freshman Athlete of the Year.

Pro circuit career 
Corkery won a Futures tournament in 2003 at Auburn, California.

Corkery competed in the men's singles of the 2002 US Open.  Corkery competed in the men's doubles of the 2004 US Open where he partnered with Warburg, losing in the first round.

In 2006, Corkery played World Team Tennis. 

Before college, Corkery was the singles and doubles champion at the 2001 International Grasscourts.  He was also the 1999 singles and doubles champion at the National Indoors.

ATP Challenger and ITF Futures finals

Singles: 3 (1–2)

Doubles: 14 (7–7)

References

External links

1983 births
Living people
American male tennis players
Stanford Cardinal men's tennis players
Tennis people from California
Place of birth missing (living people)